Echinocereus bonkerae, also known as pinkflower hedgehog cactus, Bonker hedgehog, or short spined strawberry cactus, is a species of hedgehog cactus. It was named in honour of Frances Bonker.

References

External links 
 

bonkerae